Marcel Švejdík (born 30 August 1973) is a retired Czech football midfielder. He played in the Gambrinus liga for various clubs, playing a total of over 100 top-flight matches. He also played in Slovakia for MŠK Žilina, signing for the club in 2001.

Švejdík played international football at under-21 level for Czech Republic U21.

References

External links 

1973 births
Living people
Czech footballers
Czech Republic under-21 international footballers
Czech First League players
FC Viktoria Plzeň players
FK Drnovice players
FK Hvězda Cheb players
FC Fastav Zlín players
Bohemians 1905 players
Slovak Super Liga players
MŠK Žilina players
Czech expatriate footballers
Expatriate footballers in Slovakia

Association football midfielders